The second season of The Great Kiwi Bake Off premiered on TVNZ 2 on 3 November 2019 with hosts Hayley Sproull and Madeleine Sami and judges Dean Brettschneider and Sue Fleischl returning for the season. This season saw each episode expanded to ninety-minutes and featured the Signature, Technical, and Showstopper challenges on every episode instead of just the finale like the previous season.

The season was won by Trevor "Trev" Hall with Heather Andrew and Naomi Toilalo finishing as runner-ups.

Bakers
Ages, names, and hometowns stated are at time of filming.

Bakers progress

Colour key:

 Baker was one of the judges' least favourite bakers that week, but was not eliminated.
 Baker was one of the judges' favourite bakers that week, but was not the Star Baker.
 Baker got through to the next round.
 Baker was eliminated.
 Baker was the Star Baker.
 Baker was a runner-up.
 Baker was the season's winner.

Episodes

 Baker eliminated
 Star Baker
 Winner

Episode 1: Cake
For the signature challenge, the bakers had to bake 12 lamingtons in two hours. For the technical challenge set by Sue, the bakers had ninety minutes to bake a Battenberg cake. For the showstopper challenge, the bakers had to bake a two-tiered mirrored glazed cake that reflected the baker's personality in four hours.

Episode 2: Biscuits
For the signature challenge, the bakers had to bake 24 identical savoury sandwich biscuits in two hours. For the technical challenge set by Sue, the bakers had seventy-five minutes to bake 36 macarons, 18 dark chocolate & orange and 18 white chocolate & raspberry. For the showstopper challenge, the bakers had to bake a 3-D biscuit selfie that reflected a photograph of the baker in a memorable place in four hours.

Episode 3: Celebration
For the signature challenge, the bakers had to bake 24 ANZAC biscuits in ninety minutes. For the technical challenge set by Dean, the bakers had three hours to bake 12 hot cross buns. For the showstopper challenge, the bakers had to bake a scary Halloween cake in four hours.

Episode 4: Pastry
For the signature challenge, the bakers had to bake a freestanding tart with a pastry base, a custard filling, and fruit in two hours. For the technical challenge set by Dean, the bakers had two-and-a-half hours to bake an apple tarte tatin. For the showstopper challenge, the bakers had to bake and assemble a religieuse à l'ancienne that resembled a nun consisting of two flavors of decorated éclairs and a "head" of profiteroles in four hours.

Episode 5: Bread
For the signature challenge, the bakers had to bake a  diameter pizza in two hours. For the technical challenge set by Dean, the bakers had two-and-a-half hours to bake a chocolate kugelhupf. For the showstopper challenge, the bakers had to bake a bread centerpiece in four hours.

Episode 6: International
For the signature challenge, the bakers had to bake 12 identical Cornish pasties in one hour and forty-five minutes. For the technical challenge set by Sue, the bakers had two hours to bake nastars. For the showstopper challenge, the bakers had to bake a freestanding charlotte cake with homemade sponge fingers, a set mousse, and three layers of genoise sponge in four hours.

Episode 7: Dessert (Semi-Final)
For the signature challenge, the bakers had to bake six crème brûlées that had to be brûléed traditionally in the oven instead of with a blowtorch in two hours. For the technical challenge set by Sue, the bakers had two hours and thirty minutes to bake 12 Opera cakes.

Episode 8: Christmas (Final)
For the signature challenge, the bakers had to bake 24 mini Christmas pies in two hours. For the technical challenge set by Dean, the bakers had three hours to bake two Christmas stollens. For the showstopper challenge, the bakers had to bake a  Christmas tree meringue with sugar work in five hours.

References

TVNZ original programming
TVNZ 2 original programming
2019 New Zealand television seasons